Toole County is a county in the northern portion of the U.S. state of Montana. As of the 2020 census, the population was 4,971. Its county seat is Shelby. The county was established in 1914 from parts of Hill County and Teton County and was named after Joseph Toole, the first and fourth governor of Montana. Its northern boundary is the Canada–United States border south of Alberta.

Geography

Its northern boundary is the Canada–United States border. A part of its southern boundary by the southwestern county corner is formed by Marias River, which flows eastward through the southern part of the county. In the eastern part are several creeks, the largest of which is Willow, which rises in the Sweet Grass Hills and follows a southerly course through the county. In the Sweet Grass Hills and elsewhere indications of oil and gas have been found.

Major highways
  Interstate 15 - connects to Alberta Highway 4 at Canadian border
  U.S. Route 2

Adjacent counties

 Glacier County - west
 Pondera County - south
 Liberty County - east
 County of Warner No. 5, Alberta - north
 County of Forty Mile No. 8, Alberta - northeast

Demographics

2000 census
As of the 2000 United States census,  there were 5,267 people, 1,962 households, and 1,308 families in the county. The population density was 3 people per square mile (1/km2). There were 2,300 housing units at an average density of 1 per square mile (0.5/km2). The racial makeup of the county was 93.89% White, 0.15% Black or African American, 3.19% Native American, 0.30% Asian, 0.02% Pacific Islander, 0.32% from other races, and 2.13% from two or more races. 1.16% of the population were Hispanic or Latino of any race. 23.0% were of German, 19.4% Norwegian, 10.2% Irish, 8.3% American and 8.3% English ancestry. 93.7% spoke English, 4.2% German and 1.3% Spanish as their first language.

There were 1,962 households, out of which 32.30% had children under the age of 18 living with them, 56.80% were married couples living together, 6.50% had a female householder with no husband present, and 33.30% were non-families. 30.20% of all households were made up of individuals, and 13.70% had someone living alone who was 65 years of age or older.  The average household size was 2.47 and the average family size was 3.09.

The county population contained 25.50% under the age of 18, 6.80% from 18 to 24, 28.20% from 25 to 44, 23.60% from 45 to 64, and 15.90% who were 65 years of age or older. The median age was 39 years. For every 100 females there were 106.50 males. For every 100 females age 18 and over, there were 107.20 males.

The median income for a household in the county was $30,169, and the median income for a family was $39,600. Males had a median income of $27,284 versus $19,141 for females. The per capita income for the county was $14,731. About 9.70% of families and 12.90% of the population were below the poverty line, including 15.00% of those under age 18 and 9.50% of those age 65 or over.

2010 census
As of the 2010 United States census, there were 5,324 people, 2,015 households, and 1,246 families in the county. The racial makeup of the county was 92.0% white, 4.5% American Indian, 0.5% black or African American, 0.4% Asian, 0.6% from other races, and 1.9% from two or more races. Those of Hispanic or Latino origin made up 2.4% of the population. In terms of ancestry, 30.8% were German, 17.7% were Irish, 15.8% were English, 10.5% were Norwegian, and 3.6% were American.

Of the 2,015 households, 27.3% had children under the age of 18 living with them, 49.8% were married couples living together, 7.4% had a female householder with no husband present, 38.2% were non-families, and 34.3% of all households were made up of individuals. The average household size was 2.26 and the average family size was 2.88. The median age was 41.5 years.

The median income for a household in the county was $42,949 and the median income for a family was $54,722. Males had a median income of $41,490 versus $32,582 for females. The per capita income for the county was $20,464. About 11.3% of families and 15.7% of the population were below the poverty line, including 23.2% of those under age 18 and 8.0% of those age 65 or over.

Politics
Toole County voters have only selected Republican Party candidates in national elections since 1964.

Communities

City
 Shelby (county seat)

Towns
 Kevin
 Sunburst

Census-designated places
 Camrose Colony
 Hillside Colony
 Rimrock Colony
 Sweet Grass

Other unincorporated communities

 Devon
 Dunkirk
 Ethridge
 Ferdig
 Galata
 Gold Butte
 Kippen
 Naismith
 Ohio Camp
 Oilmont
 Virden

Notable people
 Earl W. Bascom (1906-1995), "Father of Modern Rodeo" and Hall of Fame cowboy, artist, sculptor, actor, inventor; cowboyed in the 1920s on a ranch on Kicking Horse Creek once owned by his cousin C.M. Russell
 Charles M. Russell (1864-1926), cowboy artist and sculptor; ranched on Kicking Horse Creek near the Sweetgrass Hills; honored in the Hall of Great Westerners in Oklahoma City

See also
 List of lakes in Toole County, Montana
 List of mountains in Toole County, Montana
 National Register of Historic Places listings in Toole County MT

References

External links
 Toole County Website (official site)
 City of Shelby (official site)
 (Shelby Area Chamber of Commerce)
 NBMC (24/7 Local News and Events)
 Shelby Promoter (weekly newspaper)

 
1914 establishments in Montana
Populated places established in 1914